The 2000 College Nationals was the 5th Women's College Nationals.  The College Nationals was a team handball tournament to determined the College National Champion from 2000 from the US.

Venues
The championship was played at two venues at the University of North Carolina at Chapel Hill in Chapel Hill, North Carolina.

Final ranking
Source:

Awards
Source:

Top Scorers
Source:

All-Tournament Team
Source:

References

External links
 Tournament Results archived

USA Team Handball College Nationals by year
North Carolina Tar Heels team handball